"Here I Am Again" is a song written by Shel Silverstein that was originally performed by American country music artist Loretta Lynn. It was released as a single in June 1972 via Decca Records.

Background and reception 
"Here I Am Again" was recorded at the Bradley's Barn on April 26, 1972. Located in Mount Juliet, Tennessee, the session was produced by renowned country music producer Owen Bradley. Two additional tracks were recorded during this session.

"Here I Am Again" reached number three on the Billboard Hot Country Singles survey in 1970. Additionally, the song peaked at number three on the Canadian RPM Country Songs chart during this same period. It was included on her studio album, Here I Am Again (1972).

Track listings 
7" vinyl single
 "Here I Am Again" – 2:44
 "My Kind of Man" – 1:50

Charts

References 

1972 songs
1972 singles
Decca Records singles
Loretta Lynn songs
Song recordings produced by Owen Bradley
Songs written by Shel Silverstein